RR Coronae Borealis (RR CrB, HD 140297, HIP 76844) is a M3-type semiregular variable star located in the constellation Corona Borealis with a parallax of 2.93mas being a distance of . It varies between magnitudes 7.3 and 8.2 over 60.8 days. Located around 1228 light-years distant, it shines with a luminosity approximately 2180 times that of the Sun and has a surface temperature of 3309 K.

References

Corona Borealis
Semiregular variable stars
M-type giants
Coronae Borealis, RR
140297
076844
Durchmusterung objects